Cocking Railway Station served the village of Cocking in West Sussex, England. It was on the former London Brighton and South Coast Railway line between Chichester and Midhurst. The station was designed by T. H. Myres, in his standardized Domestic Revival style, each formed like a large "Country House", similar to the stations on the Bluebell Railway.

History
The station opened on 11 July 1881, but the traffic hoped for never really materialised. The station lost its passenger services on 6 July 1935, although freight continued. Services between Cocking and Midhurst were stopped completely by a washout of an embankment in November 1951, and Cocking became the terminus of the line from Chichester, until 28 August 1953 when it was completely closed. The station is now used as a private home.

Accidents and incidents
In 1904, a freight train hauled by LB&SCR D1 class locomotive No. 239 Patcham was derailed near Cocking.

On 19 November 1951 a freight train hauled by LB&SCR C2X class locomotive no. 32522 was derailed between Cocking and Midhurst after part of an embankment was washed out as a result of a blocked culvert. The line was subsequently abandoned.

References

Disused railway stations in West Sussex
Former London, Brighton and South Coast Railway stations
Railway stations in Great Britain opened in 1881
Railway stations in Great Britain closed in 1953
Thomas Myres buildings
1881 establishments in England